Sukhaya Beryozovka is a rural locality (a selo) and the administrative center of Sukho-Beryozovskoye Rural Settlement, Bobrovsky District, Voronezh Oblast, Russia. The population was 1,182 as of 2010. There are 7 streets.

Geography 
Sukhaya Beryozovka is located 14 km north of Bobrov (the district's administrative centre) by road. Bobrov is the nearest rural locality.

References 

Rural localities in Bobrovsky District